James O. Rodgers is an American writer and a proponent of diverse workplaces. He has published over 100 articles and written a book on the subject. With Edgar Schein and other leaders of the field, James promotes the principles of diversity management as a strategy to improve overall business performance at conferences. Recruiter.com's Managing Editor, Matthiew Kosinski, calls Rodgers’s philosophy "dramatically different" because it "emphasizes diversity of perspective, rather than more superficial characteristics."

References  

American male writers
Living people
Year of birth missing (living people)